Culleredo is a municipality of northwestern Spain in the province of A Coruña, in the autonomous community of Galicia. Culleredo is located on the outskirts of A Coruña and its population is mainly formed of commuters. It is located in the central area of the province. It belongs to the comarca of A Coruña in the extreme south of the Burgo river. The population of Culleredo works in the service sector, and there is little industry and agriculture. The airport of A Coruña, or Alvedro, is also located in Culleredo.

Climate
Culleredo has a climate that is transitional between the mediterranean (Csb) and oceanic climates (Cfb) due to a sizeable summer drying trend that sits on the threshold between the two classifications. Culleredo is somewhat more prone to extremes than urban A Coruña, but is still heavily influenced by the warm Atlantic sea air in winter and mildened by the same air in summer, that renders the climate very mild for its latitude.

References

External links
Weblog of Culleredo

Municipalities in the Province of A Coruña